Gramsci Is Dead: Anarchist Currents in the Newest Social Movements is a book by Richard J. F. Day about whether social movements should pursue cultural hegemony.

See also 
 Antonio Gramsci

Further reading

External links 
 

2005 non-fiction books
English-language books
Canadian non-fiction books
Books about anarchism
Works about Antonio Gramsci
Autonomism
Postanarchism
Pluto Press books